Keady is a village and civil parish in County Armagh, Northern Ireland. It is south of Armagh and near the border with the Republic of Ireland. It is situated mainly in the historic barony of Armagh with six townlands in the barony of Tiranny. It had a population of 3,051 people in the 2011 Census.

A tributary of the River Callan, known as the Clea, flows from its source in Clea Lake (also spelled as Clay Lake) through the middle of the village. The River Clea once powered Keady's millwheels. In the middle of the village, on the banks of the river, stands the Old Mill, which has been converted into workshops and offices.

History

The Troubles
For more information see The Troubles in Keady, which includes a list of incidents in Keady during the Troubles resulting in two or more deaths.

Transport
The railway arrived in Keady in 1909, with the opening of the Castleblayney, Keady and Armagh Railway line from Armagh, which was extended to Castleblayney in 1910. Keady railway station opened on 31 May 1909, closed for passenger traffic on 1 February 1932 and finally closed altogether on 1 October 1957. As a cross border line, when the Irish Free State was created in 1922, it lost all passenger traffic in 1923, with freight being withdrawn from the cross border section from Castleblayney to Keady in 1924. The Armagh to Keady freight service was withdrawn on 1 October 1957.
There is a railway viaduct in Keady as well as one of the more interesting artifacts of Irish railway history, the tunnel for the Ulster and Connaught Light Railway. This was a proposal for a narrow gauge line from Greenore, County Louth to Clifden, County Galway, for which the tunnel under the railway embankment at Keady was built, but never used. Ulsterbus now use part of the tunnel as a bus garage.

People 

Cathal Boylan, Sinn Féin MLA
Michael Colgan, actor
Jimmy Jones, footballer
Tommy Makem, singer, musician, and songwriter
Sarah Makem (18 October 1900 – 20 April 1983) Traditional Irish singer
Dessie O'Hare, Irish republican paramilitary
John Dillon Nugent (1869 – 1 March 1940) Irish nationalist politician
Louisa Watson Peat (1883–1953) was an Irish-born writer and lecturer.

Churches in Keady 
 The Temple Presbyterian, Rev Ian Abraham
 Second Keady Presbyterian, Rev Alan Marsh (www.secondkeady.co.uk)
 St Matthews Church of Ireland
 St Patrick’s Church, Keady, is one of the largest churches in the Archdiocese of Armagh in regard to seating capacity. Built in 1860, it was extended and extensively renovated in 1989.

Schools 

Clea Primary School
Keady Primary School
St. Francis of Assisi Primary School
St. Mary's Boys' School (Keady)
St Patrick's High School (Keady)

Demography
Keady is classified as an intermediate settlement by the Northern Ireland Statistics and Research Agency (NISRA) (i.e. with a population between 2,500 and 4,999 people).
On Census Day (27 March 2011) the usually resident population of Keady Settlement was 3,051, accounting for 0.17% of the NI total. Of these:
21.53% were aged under 16 years and 14.00% were aged 65 and over
48.90% of the population were male and 51.10% were female
87.45% were from a Catholic background and 10.32% were from a 'Protestant and Other Christian (including Christian related)' background

Civil parish of Keady
The civil parish contains the villages of Darkley and Keady.

Townlands
The civil parish contains the following townlands:

Aughnagurgan
Brackly
Cargaclogher
Carrickduff
Clay
Corkley
Crossdened
Crossmore
Crossnamoyle
Crossnenagh
Darkley
Drumderg
Dundrum
Dunlarg
Granemore
Iskymeadow
Kilcam
Lagan
Racarbry
Tassagh
Tievenamara
Tullyglush
Tullynamalloge

See also
List of civil parishes of County Armagh
List of towns and villages in Northern Ireland

References 

County Armagh.com
Culture Northern Ireland

External links 

Keady History
Photographs of Keady Viaduct and Tunnel

Villages in County Armagh